Thisizima antiphanes is a moth of the family Tineidae. It is found in Burma and Thailand.

References

Moths described in 1894
Tineidae